Still Live is the second live album by Pittsburgh rock band The Clarks, released in 2006. It was released both as a live CD and as a concert DVD.

CD track listing 
 "Better Off Without You"
 "You Know Everything"
 "Bona Fide"
 "Maybe"
 "Rise and Fall"
 "The Letter"
 "On Saturday"
 "Hey You"
 "Shimmy Low"
 "Fast Moving Cars"
 "Nothing's Wrong Nothing's Right"
 "Boys Lie"
 "Hell On Wheels"
 "Butterflies and Airplanes"
 "Let It Go"
 "Gypsy Lounge"

DVD track listing 
 "Better Off Without You"
 "You Know Everything"
 "Help Me Out"
 "Bona Fide"
 "Maybe"
 "Rise and Fall"
 "On Saturday"
 "Hey You"
 "Shimmy Low"
 "Born Too Late"
 "Boys Lie"
 "Hell On Wheels"
 "Penny On the Floor"
 "Butterflies and Airplanes"
 "Train"
 "Let It Go"
 "Gypsy Lounge"
 "Cigarette"

Personnel 
 Scott Blasey - lead vocals, electric & acoustic guitars
 Rob James - electric & acoustic guitars, vocals
 Greg Joseph - bass guitar
 Dave Minarik - drums, vocals

The Clarks albums
2006 live albums
2006 video albums
Live video albums